Patrick DuPré (born September 16, 1954) is a former professional tennis player from the United States.

Personal
While on tour, DuPré resided in La Jolla, California.  DuPré and his wife, Rhonda, live in Savannah, Georgia.

Of the winning 1973 Stanford tennis team, DuPré, Roscoe Tanner, and Sandy Mayer were members of the Zeta Psi fraternity.

Tennis career

Juniors
While at Mountain Brook High School, he was a three-time Alabama state singles champion. In 1971, he was ranked second in the United States in the boys' 18 singles. 

In 1972, DuPré won the national junior singles championship and was top ranked in both singles and doubles nationally. He attended Stanford University and was an All-American for four years. In 1973 and 1974, Stanford won two National Collegiate Athletics Association national championships.

Pro tour
On the professional tour, DuPré won one ATP Tour singles title (the Hong Kong Open in 1982) and four doubles titles. He was inducted into the Alabama Sports Hall of Fame in 1995 and was the first tennis player ever to be brought in.

DuPré was a semifinalist at Wimbledon in 1979 and a quarterfinalist at the US Open. From 1979 through 1981, he was ranked in the top 20 in the world, reaching as high as No. 12 in June 1980.

Career finals

Singles: 10 (1 title, 9 runner-ups)

Doubles 9 (4 titles, 5 runner-ups)

References

External links
 
 
 Stanford Men's Tennis
 Savannah Tennis Coach - Patrick DuPré

1954 births
Living people
American male tennis players
American people of Walloon descent
Belgian emigrants to the United States
Sportspeople from Birmingham, Alabama
People from La Jolla, San Diego
Sportspeople from Liège
Stanford Cardinal men's tennis players
Tennis people from Alabama
People from Vestavia Hills, Alabama
People from Mountain Brook, Alabama